The 1971 U.S. Pro Tennis Championships was a men's tennis tournament played on outdoor hard courts at the Longwood Cricket Club in Boston, USA and was part of the 1971 World Championship Tennis circuit. It was the 44th edition of the tournament and was held from August 2 through August 8, 1971. Sixth-seeded Ken Rosewall won the singles title, his third U.S. Pro title, and the accompanying $10,000 first-prize money. The final was watched by 5,500 spectators.

Seeds
Champion seeds are indicated in bold text while text in italics indicates the round in which those seeds were eliminated.

Draw

Finals

Top half

Bottom half

References

1971
Singles